This article displays the squads for the 2011 World Women's Handball Championship, held in Brazil, the 20th edition of the event. Each team consisted of up to 18 players, of whom 16 may be fielded for each match.
Appearances, goals and ages as of tournament start, December 2, 2011.

Group A

Head coach: Vivaldo Eduardo

Head coach: Wang Xindong

Head coach:  Heine Jensen

Head coach: Águst Þór Jóhannsson

Head coach: Dragan Adžić

Head coach:  Thorir Hergeirsson

Group B

Head coach:  Katsuhiko Kinoshita

Head coach:  Yoon Tae-Il

Head coach: Henk Groener

Head coach: Yevgeni Trefilov

Head coach: Kang Jae-Won

Head coach: Jorge Dueñas

Group C

Head coach:  Morten Soubak

Head coach: Lorenze Verdecía Maturell

Head coach: Olivier Krumbholz

Head coach:  Hwang Kyun-young

Head coach: Radu Voina

Head coach: Mohamed Ali Sghir

Group D

Head coach:  Miguel Interllige

Head coach:  Thierry Vincent

Head coach: Vladimir Canjuga

Head coach: Jan Pytlick

Head coach: Per Johansson

Head coach: Leonardo Puñales

References
Team Rosters

World Handball Championship squads
2011 in handball